Änis Ben-Hatira (born 18 July 1988) is a Tunisian professional footballer who plays as an attacking midfielder. Between 2012 and 2016 he made 12 appearances for the Tunisia national team scoring one goal.

Club career
Born in Berlin, Ben-Hatira started his football career playing for local club Reinickendorfer Füchse before moving to TeBe Berlin, where he spent most of his youth. Following a spell at Hertha BSC, he was signed by Hamburger SV.

Ben-Hatira made his Bundesliga debut on 24 February 2007 against Eintracht Frankfurt, coming on as a substitute for Mehdi Mahdavikia. He made his first Bundesliga start against Wolfsburg on 1 April 2007. Hamburg extended his contract until 2012. On 1 February 2009, he joined MSV Duisburg on a loan until 30 June 2009 and was subsequently loaned out to MSV Duisburg for another season.

In July 2010, Ben-Hatira joined West Ham United on trial, making his debut on 28 July when he played for 64 minutes in a 2–0 win against MK Dons. However, he did not sign for West Ham and remained in Hamburg for the following season. On the final day of the 2011 summer transfer window, Ben-Hatira returned to Hertha BSC. He moved to Eintracht Frankfurt on 1 February 2016.

Ben-Hatira signed for SV Darmstadt 98 on 22 August 2016. He was released on 25 January 2017 by mutual agreement and due to alleged connections he has with Düsseldorf based organization Ansaar International, which has been described by the German state of North Rhine-Westphalia's internal intelligence agency as being "tightly interwoven in the Salafist movement".

On 1 February 2017, Ben-Hatira joined Süper Lig side Gaziantepspor on a contract until June, with the option of a further year.

After dissolving his contract with Gaziantepspor in July 2017, he joined Tunisian club Espérance Tunis in September 2017.

He joined Hungarian side Budapest Honvéd FC in February 2019 where he scored his first goal on 23 February 2019 against MTK Budapest FC.

On 31 January 2020, Ben-Hatira joined Karlsruher SC on a deal until the end of the 2019–20 season.

He played in Greece for AEL until May 2021.

International career
After playing for several German international youth sides, Ben-Hatira was first called up for the Tunisia national team on 21 February 2012.
Eight days later, he made his debut for Tunisia in a friendly match against Peru.

He scored his first goal against Guinea in 2018 FIFA World Cup qualification on 9 October 2016 in the 79th minute.

Career statistics

Club

International

Scores and results list Tunisia's goal tally first, score column indicates score after each Ben-Hatira goal.

Honours
Hertha BSC
 2. Bundesliga: 2012–13

Germany U21
 UEFA European Under-21 Championship: 2009

References

External links
 
 

1988 births
Living people
Footballers from Berlin
German footballers
Tunisian footballers
Association football midfielders
Tunisia international footballers
Germany under-21 international footballers
Germany youth international footballers
Bundesliga players
2. Bundesliga players
Regionalliga players
Süper Lig players
Nemzeti Bajnokság I players
Füchse Berlin Reinickendorf players
Tennis Borussia Berlin players
Hamburger SV II players
Hamburger SV players
Hertha BSC players
Hertha BSC II players
MSV Duisburg players
Eintracht Frankfurt players
SV Darmstadt 98 players
Gaziantepspor footballers
Espérance Sportive de Tunis players
Budapest Honvéd FC players
Karlsruher SC players
Athlitiki Enosi Larissa F.C. players
Berliner AK 07 players
 players
German people of Tunisian descent
German expatriate footballers
Tunisian expatriate footballers
Tunisian expatriate sportspeople in Turkey
Expatriate footballers in Hungary
Tunisian expatriate sportspeople in Hungary
Expatriate footballers in Greece
Tunisian expatriate sportspeople in Greece
German Salafis